Ancherythroculter daovantieni is a species of cyprinid in the genus Ancherythroculter, described in 1967. It is native to Vietnam.

Named in honor of biologist and professor Dao Van Tien, Hanoi, who provided the type specimen.

References

Fish of Vietnam
Taxa named by Petre Mihai Bănărescu
Fish described in 1967
Cyprinidae